The 1815 United States Senate election in New York was held on February 7, 1815, by the New York State Legislature to elect a U.S. Senator (Class 1) to represent the State of New York in the United States Senate.

Background
Obadiah German had been elected in 1809 to this seat, and his term would expire on March 3, 1815.

At the State election in April 1814, a Democratic-Republican majority was elected to the Assembly, and eight of the nine State Senators up for election were Democratic-Republicans. The 38th New York State Legislature met from September 26 to October 24, 1814; and from January 31 to April 18, 1815, at Albany, New York. The party strength in the Assembly as shown by the vote for Speaker was: 61 for Samuel Young and 35 for James Emott.

Candidates
State Senator Nathan Sanford was the candidate of the Democratic-Republican Party.

Assemblyman James Emott, the Speaker of the previous Assembly session, was the candidate of the Federalist Party. 

State Senator Philetus Swift received a "complimentary vote" from Sanford, traditionally the candidates did not vote for themselves.

Result
Nathan Sanford was the choice of both the Assembly and the Senate, and was declared elected.

Sources
The New York Civil List compiled in 1858 (see: pg. 63 for U.S. Senators; pg. 122 for State Senators 1814-15; pg. 189f for Members of Assembly 1814-15)
Members of the 14th United States Congress
History of Political Parties in the State of New-York by Jabez Delano Hammond (pages 393f)
Election result (U.S. Senator) at Tufts University Library project "A New Nation Votes"
Election result (Speaker) at Tufts University Library project "A New Nation Votes"

See also 
 United States Senate elections, 1814 and 1815

References

1815
United States Senate
New York